The Narval class were a group of submarines built for the Imperial Russian Navy. They were designed by the Electric Boat Company and ordered in the 1911 programme as the "Holland 31A" design. The Narval class had advanced features including watertight bulkheads, a crash diving tank and gravitationally filled ballast tanks which did not feature in contemporary Russian-designed boats. The boats were well regarded by the Russian Navy and served in the Black Sea Fleet during World War I, during which they sank 8 merchant ships and 74 coastal vessels.

At the end of 1917, the submarines were transferred to the reserve. The submarines were scuttled by British forces in April 1919 near Sevastopol.

Ships

Three submarines were built by Nikolayev Dockyard.

Kit was raised by EPRON in 1934, but the hulls of the other two boats remain on the bottom in the place they were scuttled. The whereabouts of Narval was unknown until October 2014, though some historians believe it was virtually discovered by the Soviet underwater laboratory Bentos-300 back in 1980. In June 2018, a joint expedition of the Russian Geographical Society's Sevastopol branch, the Ministry of Defence and Sevastopol State University was undertaken to examine the wreck of five submarines, including Narval and Kashalot, by using a remotely operated underwater vehicle. It was reported in May 2019 that the wreck site is to be listed as a cultural heritage.

References

Further reading
 

 

Submarine classes
Submarines of the Imperial Russian Navy